Lawrence Duran (July 26, 1925 – November 27, 2002) was an American actor and stuntman. He was perhaps best known for playing Chico Modesto in the 1961 film One-Eyed Jacks.

Life and career 
Duran was born in Los Angeles, California, of Filipino descent. He became an amateur boxer while serving in the United States Navy for three years. After being discharged, Duran became a professional boxer before he was recruited by Marlon Brando to make his screen debut in 1952 in the film Viva Zapata!. This led to a lasting friendship between Brando and Duran who later often worked as a stand-in and double for Brando. 

Duran was a stunt performer in films including What Did You Do in the War, Daddy?, The Towering Inferno, The Magnificent Seven, Naked Gun : The Final Insult, Guys and Dolls, Battle for the Planet of the Apes, The Ugly American, The Great Bank Robbery, Every Which Way but Loose, Mutiny on the Bounty, Conquest of the Planet of the Apes and Earthquake. Brando signed him for the role of Chico Modesto in the 1961 film One-Eyed Jacks. Duran co-starred in the 1967 film Good Times. 

Duran guest-starred in television programs including Gunsmoke, Mission: Impossible, Fantasy Island, The Man from U.N.C.L.E., The Fall Guy, Buck Rogers in the 25th Century, Get Smart, Hill Street Blues, Vega$, The Six Million Dollar Man,The Wild Wild West, Barnaby Jones and I Spy.

Death 
Duran died in November 2002 in Las Vegas, Nevada, at the age of 77.

Filmography

References

External links 

Rotten Tomatoes profile

1925 births
2002 deaths
People from Los Angeles
Male actors from Los Angeles
American male actors of Mexican descent
American male film actors
American male television actors
American stunt performers
20th-century American male actors
Male Western (genre) film actors
Western (genre) television actors
American male boxers